Miguel Angel Cruz (born 29 September 1955) is a Mexican long-distance runner. He competed in the marathon at the 1984 Summer Olympics.

References

1955 births
Living people
Athletes (track and field) at the 1984 Summer Olympics
Mexican male long-distance runners
Mexican male marathon runners
Olympic athletes of Mexico
Place of birth missing (living people)
Pan American Games medalists in athletics (track and field)
Pan American Games bronze medalists for Mexico
Athletes (track and field) at the 1983 Pan American Games
Medalists at the 1983 Pan American Games
Central American and Caribbean Games medalists in athletics
20th-century Mexican people
21st-century Mexican people